The VF designation was one of the oldest in use by the U.S. Navy. From 1921 to 1948 it designated "Fighting Plane Squadron" or "Fighting Squadron". It designated "Fighter Squadron" from 1948 until 2006 when the last VF squadron was redesignated to Strike Fighter (VFA) squadron. The designation has not been used since 2006. During the time the VF designation was in use there were two periods during which a suffix letter was added after the squadron designation number. From 1927 to 1937 the suffix letter denoted to which fleet the squadron belonged; B for Battle Fleet and S for Scouting Fleet. From 15 November 1946 to as late as 1 September 1948 the suffix letter denoted to which type of Carrier Air Group the squadron belonged: A for those assigned to Essex class carriers (sometimes called "Attack" carriers), B for those assigned to the large Midway class carriers (sometimes called "Battle" carriers), L for those assigned to "light" Independence or Siapan class carriers and E for those assigned to remaining small WWII "escort carriers".

Beginning in 1937, VF squadron designation numbers were determined by the hull number of the aircraft carrier (CV) from which they operated. VF-3 for example belonged to the Saratoga's Air Group as USS Saratoga was CV 3. When the ship named Air Groups were given designation numbers themselves, their designation numbers matched the CV hull numbers, the Saratoga Air Group became Carrier Air Group Three (CVG-3) and CVG-3's VF squadron was VF-3. With the massive buildup of WWII the CVG numbers became divorced from CV hull numbers, but the CVG's squadrons were still numbered with the CVG to which they were assigned so, VF-6 was the fighter squadron assigned to CVG-6 and VF-81 was the fighter squadron assigned to CVG-81. Before and during WWII each ship named Air Group and CVG had only one VF squadron assigned so numbering the VF squadron with the ship hull number or CVG designation number worked well. There were a few exceptions and in those cases either a second digit was added (VF-41 and VF-42) or a letter was added (VF-74A and VF-74B), but those instances were rare. After the war the CVG and squadron designation system was changed. CVGs were redesignated CVAG, CVBG, CVLG and CVEG according to the type of aircraft carrier to which they were assigned and they were all designated with odd numbers. Each had two VF squadrons assigned which were designated VF-1A and VF-2A for CVAG-1, VF-3A and VF-4A for CVAG-3, VF-1B and VF-2B for CVBG-1 etc... On 1 Sep 1948 the designation system changed again dropping the "A", "B", "L" and "E" from both the CVG designations and from the squadron designations. CVGs were numbered sequentially beginning with CVG-1 and each had three VF squadrons assigned which were numbered sequentially by using the CVG number followed by a single digit, so CVG-1's VF squadrons were designated VF-11, VF-12 and VF-13 and CVG-11's VF squadrons were designated VF-111, VF-112 and VF-113 etc... Beginning in 1949 most CVGs received a fourth VF squadron (VF-14, VF-24, VF-114 etc...). These varied designation systems used through the years resulted in squadron designations being reused for completely unrelated squadrons; take the designations VF-11, VF-12 and VF-13 for example. The first use of each of those designations was used to designate the single VF squadron of each of three different CVGs during WWII, CVG-11, CVG-12 and CVG-13. The second use of those designations designated three VF squadrons of CVG-1 after 1 September 1948.

Throughout this entire period, from pre-WWII to 1965, as squadrons were reassigned from one CVG to another they were redesignated to conform with the numbering system of that CVG. That practice began to be abandoned by the mid 1950s but did not completely cease until 1965. By then, all squadron designation numbers had been "frozen" and were divorced from the Carrier Air Wing (CVW) designation numbers. Later, newly established squadrons were numbered either sequentially (such as VF-1 and VF-2 established in 1972) or were given designation numbers to commemorate a long-serving disestablished squadron (VF-191 established in 1986 commemorated a squadron which had existed from 1943 to 1978). This is why today there are squadrons with numbers as low as VFA-2 and as high as VFA-213 with many numbers missing in between.

The table below does not list disestablished squadrons, it is a list of squadron designations which are no longer in use. In most cases a single squadron carried multiple designations between the time it was established and the time it was disestablished, therefore multiple designations in the table belonged to a single squadron. Most of the squadron designations in the table belonged to squadrons which have been disestablished, but also included are former designations of some VFA squadrons which are still active, and one which has been deactivated. This table includes all "VF" designations that have been used by US Navy aircraft squadrons except for those assigned to USNR squadrons which existed before 1970 unless they were activated, in which case they are included. It also does not include 25 "VF(N)" designations (night fighter) which were used between 1943 and 1946. Sorting the table by the "Disestablished as (or current designation)" column will display all designations belonging to a single squadron grouped together, note that many squadrons were designated as both VF and VA squadrons at different times during their existence.

Note: The parenthetical (first use), (second use), (1st), (2nd), (3rd) etc... appended to some designations in the table below are not a part of the squadron designation system. They are added to indicate that the designation was used more than once during the history of U.S. Naval Aviation and which use of the designation is indicated. Absence indicates that the designation was used only once.

See also
 List of inactive United States Navy aircraft squadrons
 List of United States Navy aircraft squadrons
 List of United States Navy aircraft wings
 Naval aviation
 Modern US Navy carrier air operations
 List of United States Navy aircraft designations (pre-1962) / List of US Naval aircraft
 United States Naval Aviator
 Naval Flight Officer
 United States Marine Corps Aviation
 Military aviation

References and notes
Notes

References

Bibliography
Dictionary of American Naval Aviation Squadrons:

External links
 DANAS Volume 1 - The History of VA, VAH, VAK, VAL, VAP and VFA Squadrons (1995)
 Chapter 1 – The Evolution of Aircraft Class and Squadron Designation Systems
 Appendix 4 – U.S. Navy Squadron Designations and Abbreviations
 Appendix 6 – Lineage Listing for VA, VA(AW), VAH, VA(HM), VAK, VAL, VAP, and VFA Squadrons (2000)
 DANAS Volume 2 - The History of VP, VPB, VP(H) and VP(AM) Squadrons
 Chapter 2 – Guidelines for Navy Aviation Squadron Lineage and Insignia
 Appendix 4 – Lineage Listing for VP, VB, VPB, VP(HL), VP(ML), VP(MS) and VP(AM) Squadrons
 OPNAVINST 5030.4G – Navy Aviation Squadron Lineage and Naval Aviation Command Insignia (2012)

Aircraft squadrons
Aircraft squadrons list, Inactive
Squadrons